Williamwhitmaniaceae  is a family in the order Bacteroidales.

References

Bacteroidia